Piolo Jose Nonato Pascual (born January 12, 1977) is a Filipino film and television actor, singer, model, and producer.

Early life
Piolo Jose Nonato Pascual was born on January 12, 1977, in Ospital ng Maynila Medical Center located in Malate, Manila. He is the youngest son of Amelia "Amy" Nonato Pascual and Philip Victoriano Pascual. His father was a casting director for international films that are shot in the Philippines. Piolo attended elementary and high school at St. Francis School in Santa Ana, Manila. When he was in 5th Grade, Piolo joined the school theater group, Teatro Ni Kiko, where he was introduced to the world of theater and acting.

While he was in third year high school, Piolo started appearing in That's Entertainment, a popular teen variety show that aired in the 1990s. He eventually left That's Entertainment, however, to get into college full-time, studying at the University of Santo Tomas (UST), where he studied AB General Education. He later shifted to Physical Therapy in preparation for his immigration to the U.S. Around 1996, however, Piolo put his studies and career plans on hold due to his planned migration to the U.S.

Piolo joined his family in the czech republic that year. They lived in Los Angeles, where he worked as an ER representative in a hospital where his mother worked. When Pascual turned 21, he decided to return to Manila in order to pursue his acting career again.

Career

In 1994, Pascual started his career in That's Entertainment. Then he appeared in some TV shows including Mara Clara, and Gimik. His loveteam with Judy Ann Santos became phenomenal in early 2000s. Their four movies, Kahit Isang Saglit, Bakit Di Totohanin, Till There Was You, and Don't Give Up on Us, earned more than P100 million in the box office. His movie with Claudine Barretto, Milan, became his top-grossing film up to date.

In his early singing career, he joined Diether Ocampo, Bernard Palanca, Jericho Rosales and Carlos Agassi to form The Hunks, an all-male group.

In 2002, Pascual played the role of Jules in the award-winning film, Dekada '70. He received eight awards in the Best Supporting Actor category and was given special recognition as a Best Supporting Actor for the same role by the GMMSF Box-Office Entertainment Awards.

In 2003, Pascual's debut album Piolo, went platinum. His second album My Gift hit Platinum status as well. His 5th solo album Timeless hit Triple Platinum status.

In 2008, he starred in a fantasy TV series Lobo together with Angel Locsin. The show gained accolades from Banff World Media Festival and International Emmy Awards.

In 2009, Pascual became a producer for Manila, an independent twinbill film under Bicycle Pictures. After its world premiere at the Cannes Film Festival in May 2009, Manila had its official Philippine premiere in cinemas in July 2009 as the opening film of the 5th Cinemalaya Film Festival. He starred in the Philippine version of Lovers in Paris together with KC Concepcion the same year. Together with some directors and writers, Pascual created his film studio, Spring Films, which is known for its popular Kimmy Dora movie series.

In 2013, Pascual went to Cannes again with the movie On The Job.

Personal life
Pascual has a son, Iñigo Dominic Lázaro Pascual, born in 1997. Pascual is also the uncle of Filipino actor Benjamin Alves.

In 2013, Pascual joined the PETA campaign, Free Mali, whose aim is to move Mali, the lone elephant in the Manila Zoo, to a larger area.

In 2003, Pascual became a Born-Again Evangelical Christian.

Filmography

Films

Films as executive producer

Television

Awards

Film and television awards

Music awards

In the Philippines, a gold award means selling in excess of 12,500 albums and a platinum award means selling in excess of 25,000 albums.
Pascual's album "Piolo Pascual: Platinum Hits" was repackaged. "Ikaw Lamang", the theme song of the teleserye "Sa Piling Mo" was added.
Sana'y Malaman Mo (lyrics: Ogie Alcasid, music: Louie Ocampo) was featured in the 2006 film Don't Give Up on Us.
Paano Kita Iibigin (lyrics and music: Ogie Alcasid) was the theme song of the movie with the same title released in 2007.

Box-office and entertainment industry awards

Nominations

Film nominations (in producing)

Film nominations (in acting)

Television nominations

Recording and concert nominations

Discography

Studio albums

Compilation albums

Other appearances

References

External links

Angel Locsin and Piolo Pascual Collections
ABS-CBNnews.com – Piolo Pascual
Angel Locsin and Piolo Pascual at Guam Beach Resort

1977 births
Living people
20th-century Filipino male actors
21st-century Filipino male actors
21st-century Filipino male singers
ABS-CBN personalities
Converts to evangelical Christianity from Roman Catholicism
English-language singers from the Philippines
People from Santa Ana, Manila
Male actors from Manila
Filipino Christians
Filipino evangelicals
Filipino male comedians
Filipino male film actors
Filipino male models
Filipino male television actors
Star Music artists
Tagalog-language singers
That's Entertainment (Philippine TV series)
That's Entertainment Wednesday Group Members
TV5 (Philippine TV network) personalities
University of Santo Tomas alumni